Dante Carniel (13 September 1887 – 2 May 1959) was an Italian fencer. He competed in the team foil competition at the 1924 Summer Olympics.

References

External links
 

1887 births
1959 deaths
Italian male fencers
Olympic fencers of Italy
Fencers at the 1924 Summer Olympics